Ayman Aly Kamel (born September 4, 1965) is an Egyptian diplomat, and the current Assistant Foreign Minister for Asia, Australia, New Zealand, and the Pacific Islands. He has previously served as Ambassador of Egypt to Japan from October 2017 to October 2021.  He has also served as the First Undersecretary of Foreign Affairs in Egypt, and Consul-General in Sydney.

Ambassador Kamel has over 35 years of experience as a career diplomat and public service official in various Egyptian missions abroad. Previously, he served the Head of the Consular mission in Jordan, where he had been looking after the interests of a community of more than 300 000 Egyptians. Prior to this assignment he was Consul and Deputy Chief of mission in several countries including Italy, Mexico and the Sultanate of Oman.

Early life and education
Ayman Kamel was born in Cairo. He was educated in French-language schools, and received a degree of Bachelor of Arts in French Language and Literature in 1986. He holds a Diploma in International Relations from Geneva in 1994, as well as several specialized studies certificates in Diplomacy and Negotiations from Georgetown University in the United States, the German Foundation for International Development in Berlin, and the Egyptian Institute for Diplomatic Studies.

Career
Mr. Kamel held different positions in the Ministry of Foreign Affairs; he was appointed Deputy Assistant Foreign Minister from 2008 to 2010, and was responsible for several committees aiming at optimizing administrative performance.

He participated in various international Conferences and Conventions dealing with numerous vital issues such as Interfaith Dialogue, Regional development, and multilateral cooperation and he was one of the Egyptian officers responsible for convening several rounds of the Middle East Peace Talks. He masters several languages including Arabic, French, English, Italian and Spanish.

Ambassador Kamel performed numerous volunteer tasks for Humanitarian causes with Charity Organizations such as the International Red Cross, the Egyptian Red Crescent, Caritas, Rotary and Lions.

After serving on duty as ambassador for around four years, in October 2021, he was eventually received by Emperor Naruhito for the farewell meeting at the Tokyo Imperial Palace, and there he appreciated the sovereign's support and concern during his tenure. He also remarked to the emperor that Egypt and Japan collaborated for the recent years on various matters such as education, archaeology, healthcare and prevention of COVID-19 spreading.

References

External links 
 Japan Must Do Whatever it Takes to Denuclearize North Korea, on May 31, 2018 
 Egypt–Japan Relations: Long History and Enduring Partnership (العلاقات المصرية – اليابانية: تاريخ طويل وشراكة مستمرة) , on July 13, 2018
 Ask Ambassador Ayman Kamel NIPPON.com
 Video of the Press Conference by Ambassador Kamel at the Japan Press Club, on March 8, 2018
 Ambassador Kamel visit to Soka University
 Interview with his Excellency Mr. Ayman Kamel, Ambassador of Egypt to Japan, May 10, 2019
 Arab News article: Ambassador Kamel establishing "Japan Egyptologist Council"
 Ambassador of Egypt interview by Timeout Japan, on September 22, 2021

Diplomats from Cairo
Ambassadors of Egypt to Japan
1965 births
Living people